Willie Roy Evans (December 1, 1937 – January 4, 2017) was a running back for the University at Buffalo football team in the late 1950s.

In 1958, the Buffalo Bulls refused an offer to play Florida State University in the Tangerine Bowl because Evans and backup defensive end Mike Wilson were not welcome to play in Orlando because they were black. After graduation, Evans was drafted by Ralph Wilson for the inaugural season of the American Football League's Buffalo Bills. After his football career, Willie Evans taught in Buffalo area schools for more than 30 years. He coached football, and tennis and swimming, and ran a city parks program for most of that time as well. He served as an adviser for the university's alumni association.

Evans died in Buffalo on January 4, 2017, aged 79.

See also
 Buffalo Bulls football

References

External links

 Willie Evans, UB Football - University at Buffalo Libraries  Digital Collections
 "All or Nothing", ESPN.com
 When Buffalo Declined the 1958 Tangerine Bowl Because of Racism, New York Times, November 15, 2008
 University at Buffalo Alumni Association 2008-09 Board of Directors

1937 births
2017 deaths
American football halfbacks
Buffalo Bulls football players
Players of American football from Buffalo, New York
Buffalo Bills players